Lorry Gloeckner (born January 25, 1956) is a Canadian former ice hockey player who played 13 games in the National Hockey League for the Detroit Red Wings during the 1978–79 season.

Career statistics

Regular season and playoffs

External links
 

1956 births
Living people
Boston Bruins draft picks
Calgary Cowboys draft picks
Canadian ice hockey defencemen
Detroit Red Wings players
Ice hockey people from Saskatchewan
Johnstown Red Wings players
Kansas City Red Wings players
Sportspeople from Kindersley
Victoria Cougars (WHL) players